is a Japanese kabuki actor, one of the most popular tachiyaku (specialist in male roles) currently performing.

Like many members of the kabuki community, he can trace his lineage back several generations, many members of his family being kabuki actors as well. His father and grandfather were the eighth and seventh, respectively, to hold the name of Matsumoto Kōshirō, and he traces his lineage back to his great-great-grandfather Nakamura Karoku I, if not further. Kōshirō's brother, Nakamura Kichiemon II, son Matsumoto Koshirō X and grandson Ichikawa Somegorō VIII are active in the kabuki theater as well, and his daughter, Takako Matsu is an experienced film actress. In addition, Kōshirō has a number of disciples, including Matsumoto Kingo III, Matsumoto Kōemon I, and Ichikawa Komazō XI.

Life and career
He made his stage debut in 1945, at the age of three, under the name Matsumoto Kintarō II, and took the name Ichikawa Somegorō VI four years later. He succeeded his father to the name Matsumoto Kōshirō in 1981.

A graduate of Waseda University, and a versatile actor, Kōshirō IX has performed extensively not only in kabuki, but in Western stage plays, film, and television. He has played, among many other roles, Benkei in Kanjinchō, Kōchiyama Sōshun in Kōchiyama, Kumagai Jirō Naozane in Kumagai Jinya, and Matsuōmaru in Sugawara Denju Tenarai Kagami.

In 1970, Kōshirō appeared in the lead role in Man of La Mancha on Broadway in New York. Also, he has appeared as the King of Siam in The King and I in the West End in London. Other stage roles have included Motl in Fiddler on the Roof, the title role in Sweeney Todd, Salieri in Amadeus, Kitagawa Utamaro in the musical Utamaro, and Zeami Motokiyo in Musical Zeami.

Filmography

Film
Whirlwind (1964) – Jūbei
Nichiren (1979) – Hōjō Tokiyori
Final Take (1986) – Shirota
April Story (1998) – Uzuki's father
13 Assassins (2010) – Makino Yukie
Tenchi: The Samurai Astronomer (2012) – Hoshina Masayuki
Suzume (2022) – Hitsujirō Munakata (voice)

Television
Ōgon no Hibi (1978) – Luzon Sukezaemon
Sanga Moyu (1984) – Kenji Amō
Hana no Ran (1994) – Shuten-dōji
Furuhata Ninzaburō Special(2004) - His Excellency Ambassador Takechiyo Mayuzumi
Sanada Maru (2016) – Luzon Sukezaemon

Japanese dub
The Jungle Book (2016) – Baloo (voice-over for Bill Murray)

Honors
 Kikuchi Kan Prize (2002)
 Japan Art Academy (2002)
 Medal with Purple Ribbon (2005)
 Person of Cultural Merit (2012)
 Order of Culture (2022)

See also
 Matsumoto Kōshirō - series of actors holding this name

Notes

External links
Jumonji, Bishin. Koshiro Matsumoto. Tokyo: Purejidento, 2002. . A collection of photographs by Jumonji.
Matsumoto Kōshirō IX at Kabuki21.com
J Dorama

Japanese male actors
Kabuki actors
1942 births
Living people
Taiga drama lead actors
Persons of Cultural Merit
Recipients of the Order of Culture